Lalitpur Metropolitan City, historically Patan ( Pāṭana, Nepal bhasa :  Yela), is the fourth most populous city of Nepal after Kathmandu, Pokhara and Bharatpur, and it is located in the south-central part of Kathmandu Valley, a new metropolitan city of Nepal. Lalitpur is also known as Manigal. It is best known for its rich cultural heritage, particularly its tradition of arts and crafts. It is city renowned for its festival and feast, fine ancient art, and the making of metallic, wood and stone carved statues. At the time of the 2011 Nepal census it had a population of 226,728 in 54,748 individual households. The city received extensive damage from an earthquake on 25 April 2015.

Geography

Lalitpur is on the elevated tract of land in Kathmandu Valley on the south side of the Bagmati River, which separates it from the city of Kathmandu on the northern and western side. The Karmanasa Khola acts as the boundary on the eastern side. It was developed on relatively thin layers of deposited clay and gravel in the central part of a dried ancient lake known as the Nagdaha.

The city has an area of 15.43 square kilometres and is divided into 29 municipal wards. It is bounded by:
East: Mahalaxmi Municipality
West:  Kirtipur (Kirat Kingdom of Yalamber Clan) Municipality and Kathmandu Metropolitan City (KMC)
North: Kathmandu Metropolitan City (KMC)
South: Godawari Municipality.

Climate
Climate is characterized by relatively high temperatures and evenly distributed precipitation throughout the year. The Köppen Climate Classification subtype for this climate is "Cfa" (Humid Subtropical Climate).

History
Lalitpur is believed to have been founded in the third century BC by the Kirat dynasty and later expanded by Licchavis in the sixth century. It was further expanded by the Mallas during the medieval period.

There are many legends about its name. The most popular one is the legend of the god Rato Machhindranath, who was brought to the valley from Kamaru Kamachhya, located in Assam, India, by a group of three people representing the three kingdoms centered in the Kathmandu Valley..

One of them was called Lalit, a farmer who carried god Rato Machhindranath to the valley all the way from Assam, India. The purpose of bringing the god Rato Machhindranath to the valley was to overcome the worst drought there. There was a strong belief that the god Rato Machhindranath would bring rain in the valley. It was due to Lalit's effort that the god Rato Machhindranath was settled in Lalitpur. Many believe that the name of the town is kept after his name Lalit and pur meaning township.

In May, a chariot festival honoring the deity known as Bunga Dyah Jatra is held in Patan. It is the longest and one of the most important religious celebrations in Patan. During the month-long festival, an image of Rato Machhendanath is placed on a tall chariot and pulled through the city streets in stages.

Lalitpur said to have been founded by King Veer Deva in 299 AD, but there is unanimity among scholars that Patan was a well established and developed town since ancient times. Several historical records including many other legends indicate that Patan is the oldest of all the cities of Kathmandu Valley. According to a very old Kirat chronicle, Patan was founded by Kirat rulers long before the Licchavi rulers came into the political scene in Kathmandu Valley. According to that chronicle, the earliest known capital of Kirat rulers was Thankot. Kathmandu, the present capital was most possibly removed from Thankot to Patan after the Kirati King Yalamber came into power sometimes around second century AD.

One of the most used and typical Newar names of Lalitpur is Yela. It is said that King Yalamber or Yellung Hang named this city after himself, and ever since this ancient city was known as Yala.

In 1768, Lalitpur was annexed to the Gorkha Kingdom by Prithvi Narayan Shah without any battle.

Historical monuments
The city was initially designed in the shape of the Buddhist Dharma-Chakra (Wheel of Righteousness). The four thurs or mounds on the perimeter of Patan are ascribed around, one at each corner of its cardinal points, which are popularly known as Asoka Stupas. Legend has it that Emperor Asoka (the legendary King of India) visited with his daughter Charumati to Kathmandu in 250 BC and erected five Asoka Stupas, four in the surrounding and one at the middle of the Patan. The size and shape of these stupas seem to breathe their antiquity in a real sense. There are more than 1,200 Buddhist monuments of various shapes and sizes scattered in and around the city.

The most important monument of the city is Patan Durbar Square, which has been listed by UNESCO as one of seven Monument Zones that make up the Kathmandu Valley World Heritage Site. The seven monument zones were included in the World Heritage List in 1979 as one integrated site. The monument zones are declared as protected and preserved according to the Monuments Preservation Act of 1956. The Square was heavily damaged on 25 April 2015 by an earthquake.

Lalitpur was planned in Vihars and Bahils. Out of 295 Vihars and Bahils of the valley 56% of them are in Patan. The water conduits, stone spouts, jaladroni (water tanks), artistic gate ways, Hindu temples and Buddhist Vihars adorn the city.

Demographics
At the time of the 2011 Nepal census, Lalitpur Metropolitan City had a population of 292,848. Of these, 45.0% spoke Nepali, 35.2% Newar, 6.2% Tamang, 3.4% Maithili, 1.7% Magar, 1.5% Bhojpuri, 1.3% Rai, 0.9% Gurung, 0.9% Tharu and 3.9% other languages as their first language.

In terms of ethnicity/caste, 39.6% were Newar, 15.9% Chhetri, 11.9% Hill Brahmin, 8.3% Tamang, 5.4% Magar, 3.5% Rai, 1.8% Gurung, 1.5% Tharu, 1.3% Limbu and 10.8% others.

In terms of religion, 72.3% were Hindu, 19.2% Buddhist, 5.7% Christian, 1.7% Kirati, 0.8% Muslim, 0.1% Prakriti and 0.2% others.

Economy

A substantial portion of the population is engaged in trades, notably in traditional handicrafts and small-scale cottage industries, and some residents work in agriculture. Lalitpur has produced the highest number of renowned artists and finest craftsmen ever recorded in the history of Nepali art.

Lalitpur has maintained a culture of craftwork even in the face of rapid urbanization and many social and political upheavals.

The city is less urbanized than Kathmandu, north of the Bagmati river, but is home to many workshops, stores, restaurants, hotels, schools, embassies and other important sectors of the Kathmandu Valley economy.

Buddha Air has its headquarters in Jawalakhel, near Patan.

Education

Postsecondary education
Lalitpur is home to Pulchowk Engineering Campus, one of the oldest and most reputed colleges affiliated with the Institute of Engineering, Tribhuvan University. Patan Academy of Health Sciences is the only medical university in the city with Patan Hospital as its primary teaching hospital, and there is another medical school - KIST Medical College in Lalitpur. Other institutions of higher learning in Patan include Kathmandu University School of Management (KU SOM) and Patan Multiple Campus. Pinnacle College, one of the oldest private college of Lalitpur.

Primary and secondary education
The city is served by a number of private and public institutions providing education from primary until secondary level. Among all, the largest and reputed schools are United School, Ullens School, Rato Bangala School, Premier International IB World School, British School, St. Xavier's School,Nepal Don Bosco SchoolGyanodaya Bal Batika School, United Universal School
 and Adarsha Vidya Mandir.

Other schools include the Hindu Vidya Peeth-Nepal, Ideal Model Higher Secondary School, Dhobighat, St. Mary's, Little Angels School, Graded English Medium School, DAV Sushil Kedia, Adarsha Kanya Niketan, Tri-padma Vidyashram, Nepal Don Bosco school, Adarsha Saral Madhyamik Vidyalaya, Sudesha high School, and Nava Suryodaya English Secondary School.

Libraries
Nepal National Library which was established in 1957 AD was moved to Lalitpur from Singha Durbar in 2061 BS. It is at Harihar Bhawan. Madan Puraskar Pustakalaya which awards the Madan Puraskar and Jagadamba Shree Puraskar literary prizes is in the city. There are also numbers of library around Lalitpur Metropolitan city such as Deepawali Pustakalaya in Satdobato, Buddhibikash Library in Lagankhel.

Landmarks

Lalitpur is renowned as a very artistic city. Most of the Nepalese art is devoted to gods, and there are an abundance of temples and viharas. Notable landmarks include:

Patan Durbar Square: The palace square and residence of the Malla rulers of Patan state which now houses a museum.
Patan Dhoka: One of the historical entrances to the old city.
Hiranya Varna Mahavihar: A Buddhist temple known locally as Golden Temple.
Mahabouddha Temple: Also known as 1000 Buddha Temple modeled liked the Mahabodhi temple in Bodh Gaya.
Kumbheshwar Temple: A Shiva temple with two ponds whose water is believed to come from Gosaikunda.
Banglamukhi Temple: A temple which is one of the ten mahavidyas (great wisdom goddesses) in Hinduism.
Ratnakar Mahavihar: Also known as Ha Baha, the viahara complex is the official residence of the Kumari of Patan.
Krishna Mandir: One of the stone temples of Nepal built by King Siddhinarsingh Malla in the 16th century.
Central Zoo: Central Zoo was established in 1932 by Rana Prime Minister Juddha Shumsher Jang Bahadur Rana  as a private zoo, it is the only zoo in entire Nepal. 
Pimbahal Pokhari: This large pond is a hidden gem centred around a charming lakeshore pavilion. On the north side is three-tiered Chandeswari Temple built in 1663. Walk around the pond clockwise and you'll pass a 600-year-old whitewashed stupa that was damaged by Muslim invaders in 1357.

Transportation

Airports
All international and domestic flights for Kathmandu Valley are handled by Tribhuvan International Airport which lies about 7 km from Patan City Centre.

Roads
Walking is the easiest method of transportation within the city as the core is densely populated. In terms of motor transport, Kathmandu Ring Road which encircles the central part of the valley is a strategic road in the city. Connection to Kathmandu over the Bagmati River is provided by a host of road and pedestrian bridges. The most trafficked and important bridge connecting to the centre of Kathmandu is Thapathali Bridge. Since pedestrians and vehicles often have to share the same road, traffic congestion is a major problem in Patan. Efforts are being made to widen roads to make them more suitable to vehicular traffic.

Public transportation
Private companies operate a number of routes connecting Patan with other places in the valley. Buses, micro-buses and electric tempos are the most common forms of public transport seen in the city. Lalitpur Yatayat buses connects the touristic Thamel area of Kathmandu with buses stopping at Patan Dhoka, a five-minute walk to Patan Durbar Square. Lagankhel Bus Park is the central transport hub.

Infrastructure

Hospitals
Patan Hospital is the teaching hospital for the Patan Academy of Health Sciences.

Sumeru Hospital as kidney hospital locate at Dhapakhel.

Media

To Promote local culture Patan has one FM radio station Radio Sagarmatha - 102.4 MHz which is a Community radio station.

Sport, Fitness & Wellness

Nepal Squash Rackets Association (NSRA)(Satdobato,
International Swimming Complex (Satdobato),
All Nepal Football Association (ANFA) (Satdobato),
Nepal Taekwondo Association (Satdobato,
Satdobato Youth Club (Satdobato,
Khumaltar Youth Club,
Tennis Complex (Satdobato),
Army Physical Training Centre (Lagankhel),
National Sports Centre (Chyasal),
Satdobato Yog Sadhana Kendra (Satdobato),
Bhelpa Bhairav Yog Sadhana Kendra (Satdobato),
Nakipot Yog Sadana Kendra (Nakhipot),
Dholahiti Yog Sadhana Kendra (Dholahiti)
Bhalu Bhairav Gym (Satdobato)

Language
The original native language of Patan is Nepal Bhasa of Newars. Though due to the migration of other people from other places to Patan, other languages like Nepali, Tamang, etc. are also spoken.

References

External links

 
Old pictures of Patan from 1920s
Old video footage of Patan in 1978

Newar
Populated places in Lalitpur District, Nepal
Populated places established in the 3rd century BC
Metropolitan cities in Nepal
Nepal municipalities established in 1953
3rd-century BC establishments in Nepal